Waitin' on Joe is the second studio album by American country music artist Steve Azar. It was released in 2002 on Mercury Nashville Records as the second album of his career, six years after his debut album Heartbreak Town. Waitin' on Joe features the singles "I Don't Have to be Me ('Til Monday)" and the title track "Waitin' on Joe". The former was Azar's biggest hit, reaching number 2 on the Billboard Hot Country Songs charts and number 35 on the Billboard Hot 100, making it his most successful single to date, while the title track peaked at number 28 on the country charts.

Critical reception
Brian O'Neill of Allmusic gave the album two stars out of five, saying that while Azar "even bucked industry trends by writing, alone or in collaborations, everything" on the album, but called the songs "a paint-by-numbers pandering to the prevalent country radio contingency." Country Standard Time reviewer Jeffrey B. Remz was more favorable, saying, "This is not a perfect album — a bit too contemporary sounding musically, but there's enough here to alleviate waitin' on Azar."

Azar released another single for Mercury in 2005, entitled "Doin' It Right", and after this single failed to reach Top 40 on the country charts. He exited the label in favor of Midas Records Nashville, charting one single for that label but not releasing an album for that label. A third album, Indianola, was finally released in May 2008 on his own label.

Track listing

Personnel
David Angell - violin
Steve Azar - lead vocals, background vocals
Terry Brock - background vocals
John Catchings - string arrangements, cello
David Davidson - violin
Dan Harris - slide guitar
Chris Kent - bass guitar
Sonny Landreth - electric guitar, slide guitar
Luke Mason - drums, percussion, background vocals
Gary Morse - steel guitar, Weissenborn
Pamela Sixfin - violin
Tania Smith - keyboards, strings
Rafe Van Hoy - bass guitar, acoustic guitar, electric guitar
Kristin Wilkinson - viola
Jason Young - harmonica, background vocals
Jonathan Yudkin - mandolin

Chart performance

References

2002 albums
Steve Azar albums
Mercury Nashville albums